North Korea competed as the Democratic People's Republic of Korea at the 1976 Summer Olympics in Montreal, Quebec, Canada.

Medalists

Gold
 Gu Yong-ju — Boxing, Men's Bantamweight (– 54 kg)

Silver
 Ri Byong-uk — Boxing, Men's Light Flyweight (– 48 kg)

Results by event

Archery
1976 was the first time that North Korea competed in archery in the Olympics. Two women competed, taking 4th and 10th place to put North Korea at fifth place in the archery national leaderboard.

Women's Individual Competition:
 Jang Sun-yong – 2405 points (→ 4th place)
 Han Sun-hi – 2347 points (→ 10th place)

Athletics
Men's Marathon
 Choe Chang-sop — 2:16:33 (→ 12th place)
 Kim Chang-son — 2:27:38 (→ 44th place)
 Goh Chun-son — 2:31:54 (→ 52nd place)

Boxing
Men's Light Flyweight (– 48 kg)
 Ri Byong-uk 
 First Round – Defeated Sidney McKnight (CAN), KO-1 
 Second Round – Defeated Henryk Średnicki (POL), 3:2 
 Quarterfinals – Defeated Armando Guevara (VEN), 3:2
 Semifinals – Defeated Payao Pooltarat (THA), RSC-2 
 Final – Lost to Jorge Hernández (CUB), 1:4 →  Silver Medal

Men's Flyweight (– 51 kg)
 Jong Jo-ung 
 First Round — Bye
 Second Round — Defeated Joachim Schür (FRG), RSC-2 
 Third Round — Defeated Vicente Rodríguez (ESP), 3:2 
 Quarterfinal — Lost to David Torosyan (URS), 0:5

Wrestling
Men's freestyle 48 kg
 Li Yong-nam
 First Round — Defeated Kim Hwa-kyung (KOR), 10 - 11
 Second Round — Defeated Claudio Pollio  (ITA), 35 - 7
 Third Round — Lost to  Sobhan Rouhi (IRI), 14 - 13
 Fourth Round — Bye
 Fifth Round — Lost to Akira Kudo (JPN), 2 - 16 → 6th place

Men's freestyle 52 kg
 Li Bong-sun
 First Round — Defeated Diego Lo Brutto (FRA), 21 - 16
 Second Round — Defeated Fritz Niebler (GER), 4:58 (won by fall)
 Third Round — Lost to Eloy Abreu (CUB), 16 - 12
 Fourth Round — Lost to Aleksandr Ivanov (URS), 22 - 19 → 7th place

Men's freestyle 57 kg
 Li Ho-pyong
 First Round Lost to Vladimir Yumin (URS), 20 - 5
 Second Round Bye
 Third Round Defeated Zbigniew Żedzicki (POL), 13 - 10
 Fourth Round Lost to Masao Arai (JPN), 7 - 18

References

Official Olympic Reports
International Olympic Committee results database

Korea, North
1976
1976 in North Korean sport